Tiémélékro is a town in south-central Ivory Coast. It is a sub-prefecture and commune of M'Batto Department in Moronou Region, Lacs District.

In 2014, the population of the sub-prefecture of Tiémélékro was 29,267.

Villages
The 21 villages of the sub-prefecture of Tiémélékro and their population in 2014 are:

References

Sub-prefectures of Moronou Region
Communes of Moronou Region